The Yerington Paiute Tribe of the Yerington Colony and Campbell Ranch is a federally recognized tribe of Northern Paiute Indians in western Nevada.

Reservation

The Yerington Paiute Tribe has a reservation, the Yerington Reservation and Trust Lands, in Lyon County, Nevada. The reservation was established in 1916 and 1936 and is  large. In 1990, 354 tribal members lived on the reservation. The tribe had 659 enrolled members in 1992.

The Native name for the tribe refers to two Northern Paiute bands known as, Taboose-ddukaka ("Nut Grass Eaters" or "Grass Bulb Eaters") and Padutse-ddukaka ("Wild Onion Eaters").

Recent history
In 1937, the Yerington Paiute Tribe ratified its constitution and bylaws. They gained federal recognition under the 1934 Indian Reorganization Act.

Government
The Yerington Paiute Tribe of Nevada's tribal headquarters is located in Yerington, Nevada. The tribe is governed by a tribal council. The most recent administration included the following:

 Tribal Chairperson: Linda Howard
 Vice Chairperson: LaVerne Roberts
 Secretary of Record: Shelley Pugh
 Council Member: Delmar Stevens
 Council Member: Michelle Keats
 Council Member: Eleanor Smith
 Council Member: Levi Hernandez
 Council Member: Eleanor Smith.

The Yerington Paiutes operate their own education program, environmental program (overseeing air and water quality and wetlands), police force, USDA Commodities program, and social services.

Economic development
The tribe owns and operates the Arrowhead Market, a fuel and convenience store in Yerington, and Campbell Ranch, which grows alfalfa.

Notes

References
 Pritzker, Barry M. A Native American Encyclopedia: History, Culture, and Peoples. Oxford: Oxford University Press, 2000. .

External links
Yerington Paiute Tribe, official website

Northern Paiute
American Indian reservations in Nevada
Populated places in Lyon County, Nevada
Native American tribes in Nevada
Federally recognized tribes in the United States